Szőcs is a Hungarian surname. Notable people with this surname include:

 Bernadette Szőcs (b. 1995) Romanian table tennis player 
 Emőke Szőcs (b, 1985) Hungarian biathlete, Olympian
 Géza Szőcs (b. 1953) ethnic Hungarian poet and politician from Transylvania, Romania
 Hunor Szőcs (b. 1992) Romanian table tennis player  
 László Szőcs (b. 1984) Romanian futsal player  
 Réka Szőcs (b. 1989) Hungarian female association football goalkeeper
 Zsuzsanna Szőcs (b. 1962) Hungarian fencer, Olympic bronze medalist

See also
Suciu (disambiguation), the Romanian-language cognate of Szőcs

Hungarian-language surnames